Haloprogin is an antifungal drug used to treat athlete's foot and other fungal infections.  It is marketed in creams under the trade names Halotex, Mycanden, Mycilan, and Polik.

Action
Haloprogin was previously used in 1% topical creams as an antifungal agent. It was marketed over-the-counter primarily to treat tinea infections of the skin. The mechanism of action is unknown.

Haloprogin had a high incidence of side effects including: irritation, burning, vesiculation (blisters), scaling, and itching. It has since been discontinued due to the emergence of more modern antifungals with fewer side effects.

References

Alkyne derivatives
Antifungals
Chloroarenes
Organoiodides